The 1977 Kentucky Wildcats football team represented the University of Kentucky in the 1977 NCAA Division I football season. The Wildcats scored 252 points while allowing 111 points. The Wildcats finished conference play undefeated but due to NCAA probation were not eligible for a share of the SEC championship or for postseason play. The Wildcats finished the season ranked #6 in the final AP Poll.

Regular season
Kentucky's 33-13 victory vs. LSU was its third in four years over the Bayou Bengals, and the Wildcats' first at Tiger Stadium since 1949, when Bear Bryant was Kentucky's coach.

In the Border Battle, Kentucky beat Tennessee by a score of 21–17.  Entering that game, Kentucky had seven injured starters unable to play, including quarterback Derrick Ramsey, whose arm was injured so badly he could not throw the football.  Tennessee jumped out to a 17–14 lead when backup quarterback Mike Deaton completed a 36-yard pass to Felix Wilson; the injured Ramsey then entered the game and led Kentucky to a touchdown.  Tennessee's offense then took the ball to Kentucky's 22-yard line but Tennessee quarterback Jimmy Streater fumbled due to a hit by Kentucky All-American defensive end Art Still, and linebacker Kelly Kirchbaum recovered the ball to preserve the win.

Schedule

Personnel

Game summaries

Penn State

Georgia

The Prince of Wales (now Charles III) in attendance

Team players in the NFL

Awards and honors
Art Still, All-America honors

References

Kentucky
Kentucky Wildcats football seasons
Kentucky Wildcats football